("Autumnal sorrow"), WAB 72 is a lied composed by Anton Bruckner in 1864.

History 
Bruckner composed the lied on the text of "Ernst", in April 1864 during his stay in Linz. It is not known for which purpose the lied was composed.

A transcription by Emil Posch is also found in the city archive of Linz. In 1930, the work was published in Band III/2, pp. 152–157 of the Göllerich/Auer biography.

Text 

The song uses a text by "Ernst".

Music 
The 62-bar long work in E minor is scored for solo voice and piano. The emotional mood of the romantic text is outlined by triplet figures on the piano, chromatic developments, fermata, pauses and the contrast E major/E minor.

Discography 
There are three recordings of Herbstkummer:
 Marie Luise Bart-Larsson (soprano), Gernot Martzy (piano), Kammermusikalische Kostbarkeiten von Anton Bruckner – CD: Weinberg Records SW 01 036-2, 1996
 Robert Holzer (bass), Thomas Kerbl (piano), Anton Bruckner Lieder/Magnificat – CD: LIVA 046, 2011. NB: Transposed in B minor.
 Elisabeth Wimmer (soprano), Daniel Linton-France (piano) in: Bruckner, Anton – Böck liest Bruckner II – CD Gramola 99237, 2020

References

Sources 
 August Göllerich, Anton Bruckner. Ein Lebens- und Schaffens-Bild,  – posthumous edited by Max Auer by G. Bosse, Regensburg, 1932
 Anton Bruckner – Sämtliche Werke, Band XXIII/1: Lieder für Gesang und Klavier (1851–1882), Musikwissenschaftlicher Verlag der Internationalen Bruckner-Gesellschaft, Angela Pachovsky (Editor), Vienna, 1997
 Cornelis van Zwol, Anton Bruckner 1824–1896 – Leven en werken, uitg. Thoth, Bussum, Netherlands, 2012. 
 Uwe Harten, Anton Bruckner. Ein Handbuch. , Salzburg, 1996. .
 Crawford Howie, Anton Bruckner - A documentary biography, online revised edition

External links 
 
 Herbstkummer e-Moll, WAB 72 – Critical discography by Hans Roelofs 

Lieder by Anton Bruckner
1864 compositions
Compositions in E minor